Uitkoms is a town in Xhariep District Municipality in the Free State province of South Africa.

References

Populated places in the Mohokare Local Municipality